Makes Revolution was the first album released by Takanori Nishikawa and Daisuke Asakura project T.M. Revolution. The release date of this album was August 12, 1996.

Track listing

1996 albums